Libor Sovadina (born 2 November 1964 in Náchod) is a Czech former handball player who competed in the 1988 Summer Olympics.

References

1964 births
Living people
Czechoslovak male handball players
Czech male handball players
Olympic handball players of Czechoslovakia
Handball players at the 1988 Summer Olympics
People from Náchod
Sportspeople from the Hradec Králové Region